Sanaye Hormozgan is an Iranian professional basketball club based in Bandar Abbas, Iran. They compete in the Iranian Basketball Super League.

players

Notable players

References 

Basketball teams in Iran